The 1984 WAFU Club Championship was the seventh football club tournament season that took place for the runners-up of each West African country's domestic league, the West African Club Championship. It was won by New Nigerian Bank in the first of two finals matches against Ghana's Sekondi Hasaacas FC. It featured 12 clubs and 26 matches, four shorter than last season.  As Benfica Bissau forfeited, Nigeria's Bendel Insurance headed to the quarterfinals, the match totals shortened to 24.  Saint Joseph Warriors of Liberia from the first round headed to the semis, there they lost to Stade Malien from Bamako. A total of 38 goals were scored fewer than last season.

Not a single club from the Gambia took part.

Preliminary round
Its matches took place from 10 to 24 June.

|}

Intermediary Round
Its matches took place on 15 and 29 July.

|}

Semifinals
The matches took place on 19 August and 2 September.

|}

Finals
The matches took place on 7 October and 10 November.

|}

Winners

See also
1984 African Cup of Champions Clubs
1984 CAF Cup Winners' Cup

References

External links
Full results of the 1984 WAFU Cup at RSSSF

West African Club Championship
1984 in African football